Tyler Brayton (born November 20, 1979) is a former American football defensive end. He was drafted by the Oakland Raiders 32nd overall in the 2003 NFL Draft. He played college football at Colorado. Brayton also played for the Carolina Panthers and Indianapolis Colts.

College career
In 47 games at the University of Colorado, Brayton recorded 152 tackles with 12.5 sacks, 25 stops for losses, 34 quarterback pressures, 17 third-down hits, three fumble recoveries, three forced fumbles and six pass deflections.

Professional career

Oakland Raiders
Brayton was the last NFL draft pick in the first round in 2003, after Oakland acquired the first-round pick from the eventual Super Bowl Champion Tampa Bay Buccaneers in exchange for head coach Jon Gruden at the end of the 2001 season. Gruden became the Buccaneers coach after Tony Dungy's firing, with the latter taking over as the Indianapolis Colts coach when Jim E. Mora was fired the same year. Brayton was one of two Raiders selected in the first round in 2003; the other was Nnamdi Asomugha. In his debut season, he played and started in all 16 games and finished the campaign with 61 tackles and 2.5 sacks. The following season, he recorded 45 tackles, 2.5 sacks and his first career interception at the Kansas City Chiefs on December 25. During the 2005 season, Brayton played in all 16 games, notching up three starts and finished the season with 16 tackles and one sack. In 2006, he finished with 42 tackles. In his final year with the Raiders, Brayton finished the season with 11 tackles.

On November 6, 2006 in a game against the Seattle Seahawks, Brayton kneed Seahawks tight end Jerramy Stevens in the groin after Stevens had kneed him, and was ejected. Brayton was later fined $25,000 by the NFL and Stevens was fined $15,000.

Carolina Panthers
On March 4, 2008, Brayton was signed by the Carolina Panthers. In his first season at the Panthers, he played and started in all 16 games and finished the campaign with 40 tackles and a career-high 4.5 sacks.

On December 12, 2010 in a game against the Atlanta Falcons, Tyler Brayton came off the bench and elbowed Atlanta Falcons cornerback Christopher Owens in the head while Owens was running along the Carolina sideline as part of the punt coverage unit. The NFL fined Tyler Brayton $15,000 for the illegal hit. Carolina released him on July 29, 2011.

Indianapolis Colts
Brayton signed with the Indianapolis Colts on August 15, 2011.

Personal life
Brayton is the grandson of former Washington State University baseball coach Bobo Brayton

References

External links

Tyler Brayton profile by the Oakland Raiders
Tyler Brayton profile by the Carolina Panthers
Tyler Brayton profile by the Indianapolis Colts

1979 births
Living people
People from Richland, Washington
Players of American football from Washington (state)
American football defensive ends
American football defensive tackles
American football linebackers
Colorado Buffaloes football players
Oakland Raiders players
Carolina Panthers players
Indianapolis Colts players